Aeroméxico Flight 230 experienced a hard landing at Chihuahua Airport on July 27, 1981. Thirty-two people were killed when the McDonnell Douglas DC-9-32 jet aircraft was heavily damaged by impact with the ground and fire on approach in high winds.

Aircraft involved 
The plane, a McDonnell Douglas DC-9-32, (Registration XA-DEN), was delivered to Aeromexico in May of 1974, and was named Yucatan. At the time of the crash, it was 7 years old.

Accident sequence 

The flight was uneventful until landing at Chihuahua. There were isolated cumulonimbus clouds with strong squalls and showers during approach and landing. Upon touchdown, the aircraft bounced once and struck the ground; the aircraft then slid off the runway, broke up and caught on fire. Thirty-four passengers and crew were able to flee the wreckage; the smoke and fire caused the deaths of those that remained trapped.

See also 
Swissair Flight 316 another fatal aviation crash where an aircraft overran the runway.

References

External links
36 Killed and 28 Hurt In Crash of Mexican Jet – The New York Times

Accidents and incidents involving the McDonnell Douglas DC-9
Aviation accidents and incidents in 1981
Airliner accidents and incidents caused by weather
Aviation accidents and incidents in Mexico
1981 in Mexico
July 1981 events in Mexico
230